The third season of the American television drama series Breaking Bad premiered on March 21, 2010, and concluded on June 13, 2010. It consisted of 13 episodes, each running about 47 minutes. AMC broadcast the third season on Sundays at 10:00 pm in the United States. The complete third season was released on Region 1 DVD and Region A Blu-ray on June 7, 2011.

Season 3 saw actors Bob Odenkirk, Giancarlo Esposito and Jonathan Banks, who play Saul, Gus and Mike respectively, upgraded to main cast status after guest starring the previous season, although they are not credited for every episode until season 4.

Cast

Main
 Bryan Cranston as Walter White
 Anna Gunn as Skyler White
 Aaron Paul as Jesse Pinkman
 Dean Norris as Hank Schrader
 Betsy Brandt as Marie Schrader
 RJ Mitte as Walter White Jr.
 Giancarlo Esposito as Gus Fring
 Bob Odenkirk as Saul Goodman
 Jonathan Banks as Mike Ehrmantraut

Recurring

Episodes

Production
Unlike the second season, when the Breaking Bad writers planned the storyline for the entire season in advance of filming, the writing staff did not fully plan out the third season before production and instead developed the storyline as the episodes progressed. The third episode is dedicated to Shari Rhodes (the location casting director for Breaking Bad) who died due to breast cancer during the filming.

Gennifer Hutchison and Thomas Schnauz were added to the writing staff this season, both of whom had worked previously with Vince Gilligan on The X-Files. With the exception of John Shiban, who would leave at the end of the season to executive produce Hell on Wheels, the writing staff for season three would remain on the show until its conclusion in 2013.

Home media
The third season was released on DVD in Region 1 and on Blu-ray in Region A on June 7, 2011, in Region 4 on November 24, 2010 and in Region 2 in Germany on May 19, 2011.

Special features on the DVD and Blu-ray include nine audio commentaries:
"No Más" by Bryan Cranston, Aaron Paul, Anna Gunn, Skip Macdonald, Dave Porter, and Michael Slovis
"Más" by Vince Gilligan, Bryan Cranston, Aaron Paul, Anna Gunn, Bob Odenkirk, and Moira Walley-Beckett
"Sunset" by Vince Gilligan, Dean Norris, John Shiban, Kelley Dixon, and Thomas Golubic
"One Minute" by Dean Norris, Luis Moncada, Daniel Moncada, Michelle MacLaren, Thomas Schnauz, and Dave Porter
"I See You" by Vince Gilligan, Bryan Cranston, Betsy Brandt, RJ Mitte, and Gennifer Hutchison
"Kafkaesque" by Vince Gilligan, Betsy Brandt, George Mastras, and Michael Slovis
"Fly" by Vince Gilligan, Bryan Cranston, Aaron Paul, and Moira Walley-Beckett
"Half Measures" by Bryan Cranston, Adam Bernstein, Bill Powloski, Peter Gould, Jonathan Banks, and Michael Slovis
"Full Measure" by Vince Gilligan, Aaron Paul, Anna Gunn, Bob Odenkirk, and Jonathan Banks

Behind-the-scene featurettes include:
20 episodes of "Inside Breaking Bad"
"Hit and Run"
"The Music of Breaking Bad"
"White Heat: Cranston on Fire"
"Pizza of Destiny: Cranston's Greatest Shot"
"Silent But Deadly: The Brothers Moncada"
"Team S.C.I.E.N.C.E."
"AMC News Visits the Breaking Bad Writer's Room"
Mini video podcasts for every episode

Also included are a gag reel, deleted scenes, and "Better Call Saul" commercials and testimonials. Exclusive to the Blu-ray release is the Breaking Bad cast and crew photo collection.

Reception

Reviews
The third season of Breaking Bad scored 89 out of 100 on review aggregator site Metacritic indicating "universal acclaim". On review aggregator Rotten Tomatoes, the third season has an approval rating of 100% based on 35 reviews, with an average rating of 9.14/10. The site's critics consensus reads: "Breaking Bads well-toned storytelling flares up this season with dramatic story changes and calculated direction." Time proclaimed "It's a drama that has chosen the slow burn over the flashy explosion, and it's all the hotter for that choice." Newsday stated Breaking Bad was still TV's best series and it stayed true to itself. Tim Goodman praised the writing, acting, and cinematography, pointing out the "visual adventurousness" of the series. Goodman went on to call the show's visuals as "a combination of staggering beauty – the directors make use of numerous wide-angle landscape portraits — and transfixing weirdness." After the finale aired, The A.V. Club said that season three was "one of television's finest dramatic accomplishments. And what makes it so exciting — what makes the recognition of the current golden age so pressing — is that the season has not been, as [another reviewer] put it in another context, 'television good.'  The heart-in-the-throat quality of this season comes as much from the writers' exhilarating disregard for television conventions as from the events portrayed."

Awards and nominations
The third season received numerous awards and nominations, including seven Primetime Emmy Award nominations with two wins. Bryan Cranston won his third consecutive award for Outstanding Lead Actor in a Drama Series and Aaron Paul won for Outstanding Supporting Actor in a Drama Series after being nominated the previous year. The series received its second consecutive nomination for Outstanding Drama Series; Michelle MacLaren was nominated for Outstanding Directing for a Drama Series for "One Minute". Michael Slovis was nominated for Outstanding Cinematography for a One Hour Series for "No Más"; Skip Macdonald received his second nomination for Outstanding Single Camera Picture-Editing for a Drama Series for "No Más", and it was also nominated for Outstanding Sound Editing for "One Minute".

The series received four nominations for the Television Critics Association Awards, winning for Outstanding Achievement in Drama. Bryan Cranston and Aaron Paul were each nominated for Individual Achievement in Drama, with the series being nominated for Program of the Year. Cranston received his first Golden Globe nomination for Best Actor in a Drama Series. Cranston also received a Screen Actors Guild Award nomination for Outstanding Performance by a Male Actor in a Drama Series. Cranston won his third consecutive Satellite Award for Best Actor in a Drama Series, with the series winning the award for Best Drama Series for the second year in a row. Paul was nominated for Best Actor in a Supporting Role in a Series, Mini-Series or Motion Picture Made for Television. The series received four nominations for the Saturn Awards, winning the award for Best Syndicated/Cable Television Series for the second year in a row. Cranston was nominated for Best Actor on Television, Paul and Dean Norris were nominated for Best Supporting Actor on Television, and Giancarlo Esposito was nominated for Best Guest Starring Role on Television. The series received three Writers Guild of America Award nominations, for Best Drama Series, George Mastras for Best Episodic Drama for "I.F.T.", and Gennifer Hutchison for Best Episodic Drama for "I See You".

James Poniewozik of TIME named "One Minute" as the fourth-best television episode of 2010. He also included "Fly", "Half Measures" and "Full Measure" on his list of honorable mentions. The Futon Critic listed "Full Measure" as the sixth-best episode of 2010, saying that "No show has played with the expectations of we've come to expect from television more than Breaking Bad. IGN named Breaking Bad the best television series of 2010.

References

External links
 

 
2010 American television seasons
3
Television series set in 2009